Kenneth Fields is an American poet and a professor of creative writing at Stanford University, where he has been on faculty since 1967. Fields teaches the Advanced Poetry Writing Workshop for the Stanford Writing Fellows.

Bibliography
Poetry

The Other Walker
Sunbelly
Smoke
The Odysseus Manuscripts
Anemographia: A Treatise on the Wind'''Classic Rough NewsMusic from Another RoomNovelsFather of MerciesAnthologiesQuest for Reality: An Anthology of Short Poems in English'' (1969), with Yvor Winters

References

American male poets
Stanford University Department of English faculty
Living people
20th-century American poets
Year of birth missing (living people)
Place of birth missing (living people)
20th-century American male writers